Patrick Murray may refer to:

 Patrick Murray (actor) (born 1956), English screen actor
 Patrick Murray (courtier), Scottish courtier active in religious struggles in the 1590s
 Patrick Murray (politician), 2010 and 2012 congressional candidate in Virginia
 Patrick Murray (sport shooter) (1945–2021), Australian sport shooter
 Patrick Murray (theologian) (1811–1882), Irish Roman Catholic theologian
 Patrick Desmond Fitzgerald Murray (1900–1967), English-born Australian zoologist
 Patrick Murray, 1st Earl of Tullibardine (died 1644), Scottish aristocrat
 Patrick Murray, 1st Lord Elibank (1632–1649), Scottish peer
 Patrick Murray, 5th Lord Elibank (1703–1778), author  and economist
 Pato Banton (born Patrick Murray, born 1961), reggae singer and toaster
 Paddy Murray (journalist) (1953–2022), Irish journalist and writer
 Paddy Murray (footballer) (1874–1925), Scottish footballer
 Patrick Murray (American football) (born 1991), American football placekicker
 Patrick Murray of Ochtertyre (1771–1837), Scottish peer and politician
 Malcolm Patrick Murray (1905–1979), known as Pat or Patrick Murray, British civil servant

See also
Pat Murray (disambiguation)